Wanstead United Reformed Church is a United Reformed Church place of worship in Wanstead, east London. It originated in 1867 as a Congregational church in Wanstead, housed in the former Church of England building of St Luke's Church, Euston Road, which was completed in 1861 by John Johnson and soon afterwards demolished for the building of the original St Pancras Station and re-erected piece by piece in Wanstead). (The Anglican church's dedication transferred to the new Anglican church of St Luke's Church, Oseney Crescent.)

It was designated as a Grade II listed building in 2009.

St Luke's Church, Euston Road

St Luke's Church, Euston Road was a Church of England parish church on the Euston Road in St Pancras, London.

It was designed by John Johnson, also one of the architects of St Paul's Church, Camden Square. It was built in between 1856 and 1861 on the corner of Midland Road. The construction in the 1860s of the Midland Railway's London terminus, St Pancras railway station, necessitated the church's demolition. It was taken down and re-erected in 1866–67, with alterations by Johnson, as Wanstead United Reformed Church. Its sale to Wanstead provided £526 which was combined with £12,500 compensation from the railway company to build a replacement in Kentish Town.

References

External links
 

Churches in the London Borough of Redbridge
United Reformed churches in London
John Johnson buildings